Riachuelo was a Brazilian ironclad battleship completed in 1883.  She was named in honour of the Battle of Riachuelo in 1865. Built in the United Kingdom, the ship entered service with the Brazilian Navy in 1883 and remained in service until 1910.

Design

Riachuelo was built after the Brazilian Minister of the Navy, Admiral José Rodrigues de Lima Duarte, presented a report to the national legislature on the importance of modernising the Brazilian Navy by acquiring new battleships, with the intention to order two from British shipyards. Riachuelo was constructed by Samuda Brothers in London, being laid down on 31 August 1881, launched on 7 June 1883 and commissioned into the Brazilian Navy on 19 November 1883. The slightly smaller  was launched in 1885.

Riachuelo was constructed with a steel hull, and was the first battleship with a compound armour belt, following shortly after the Argentine armoured corvette . Both Riachuelo and Aquidabã had an unusual design that became popular in the 1870s and 1880s: the two main gun turrets were placed off the centreline, en echelon, with the forward turret offset to port and the aft turret to starboard. The superstructure ran the full length of the vessel, higher than both turrets, with two funnels and three fully rigged masts. Aquidabã can be distinguished by its single funnel.

These two modern battleships made the Brazilian Navy the strongest in the western hemisphere. Hilary A. Herbert, the chairman of the House Naval Affairs Committee in order to push the U.S. to increase its naval spending and build its first battleships warned Congress in 1883: “if all this old navy of ours were drawn up in battle array in mid-ocean and confronted by the Riachuelo it is doubtful whether a single vessel bearing the American flag would get into port”. By the time they were completed in 1895, developments in battleship design had made them obsolete.

In service

When the Republic of Brazil was declared in 1889, Riachuelo escorted the Brazilian Imperial Family to exile in Europe. Riachuelo and Aquidabã, the two most powerful vessels in the Brazilian Navy, were both in dock for repairs in 1891 during the first Revolta da Armada (mutiny of the Brazilian Navy), led by Custódio José de Mello, which eventually forced the dictatorial President, Marshal Deodoro da Fonseca, to resign in favour of Marshal Floriano Peixoto.

Riachuelo was modernised and rearmed in Toulon in 1893–94, where structural alterations included the replacement of the three rigged masts with two unrigged fighting masts.

Riachuelo was deactivated in 1910 and put under tow to be broken up in Europe. She arrived at Bo'ness, Scotland on 14 May 1914 to be broken up by the Forth Shipbreaking Co. (Linlithgowshire Gazette, 15 May 1914).

See also

Notes

References

Further reading

External links

 Plans for the Brazilian Battleship Riachuelo (1881) (National Archives and Records Administration)

1883 ships
Riachuelo
Ships built in Cubitt Town